The following is a list of the European Film Award winners  for Achievement in World Cinema also known as the Outstanding European Achievement in World Cinema:

Winners

References

External links
European Film Academy archive

Achievement in World Cinema
1997 establishments in Europe